The Eye 10 (also known as The Eye Infinity and The Eye 3) is a 2005 horror film directed by the Pang brothers. An international co-production of Hong Kong and Thailand, the film is the third entry in a trilogy, following the films The Eye and The Eye 2. It stars Bolin Chen, Kate Yeung, Isabella Leong, Bongkoj Khongmalai, Ray MacDonald and Kris Gu.

Plot
Chong-kwai welcomes his friends Ted, May, Kofei and April from Hong Kong to his home in Thailand. He shows them a book which describes a game of ten ways to see ghosts.

After Kofei goes missing halfway during the game after he relieved himself on a tree in the woods, April stays behind in Thailand to try to find him, while Ted and May return to Hong Kong. April disappears too later.

Back in Hong Kong, Ted and May continue to encounter ghosts. Chong-kwai returns to the shop where he bought the book and learns that he and his friends have been cursed and they need to finish the game.

Ted and May return to Thailand and play the last part of the game. They enter a ghostly dimension and finally find Kofei. They also meet April, who has committed suicide after thinking that Kofei is dead. Kofei stays behind with April while Ted and May attempt to escape, but they end up trapped in another ghostly dimension.

The Ten Ways
There are ten ways listed in the film by which one may observe a ghost:
 Getting a corneal transplant from a person who can see ghosts (as seen in The Eye)
 Attempting suicide while pregnant (as seen in The Eye 2)
 Playing ouija or a similar game
 Tapping chopsticks on a bowl and offering food at a road intersection at night to attract hungry ghosts
 Playing hide-and-seek at night while carrying a black cat
 Rubbing dirt from a grave on your eyes
 Opening an umbrella under shelter
 Brushing your hair at midnight in front of a mirror
 Bending over to look back between your legs
 Sleeping in used traditional garments for the deceased

Cast
 Kate Yeung as May
 Bolin Chen as Teddy (Ted)
 Isabella Leong as April
 Ray MacDonald as Chong-kwai
 Kris Gu as Kofei
 Bongkoj Khongmalai as Accident victim

See also
 List of ghost films

External links
 
 
 

2005 films
2000s Cantonese-language films
Thai-language films
2005 horror films
Thai ghost films
Hong Kong supernatural horror films
Thai supernatural horror films
2000s Hong Kong films